Lick Township is one of the twelve townships of Jackson County, Ohio, United States.  As of the 2010 census, 2,661 people lived in the township.

Geography
Located in the center of the county, it borders the following townships:
Coal Township: north
Milton Township: northeast
Bloomfield Township: southeast
Franklin Township: south
Scioto Township: southwest corner
Liberty Township: west

Lick Township lies between the two other Jackson County townships that do not border other counties: Coal Township to the north, and Franklin Township to the south.

Much of the city of Jackson, the county seat of Jackson County, is located in Lick Township.

Name and history

Lick Township was organized as an original township of Jackson County, and named for the salt licks within its borders. It is the only Lick Township statewide, although there are Licking Townships in Licking and Muskingum counties. The first map showing the town is a 1764 map of Henry Bouquet's expedition to Ohio, which places "Lick T." on the upper Scioto.

Government
The township is governed by a three-member board of trustees, who are elected in November of odd-numbered years to a four-year term beginning on the following January 1. Two are elected in the year after the presidential election and one is elected in the year before it. There is also an elected township fiscal officer, who serves a four-year term beginning on April 1 of the year after the election, which is held in November of the year before the presidential election. Vacancies in the fiscal officership or on the board of trustees are filled by the remaining trustees.

References

External links
County website

Townships in Jackson County, Ohio
Townships in Ohio